Sidi Boussaid is a town and commune in Mascara Province, Algeria. According to the 2012 census it has a population of 5873.

References

Communes of Mascara Province